KURV (710 kHz) is a commercial AM radio station licensed to Edinburg, Texas, and serving the Rio Grande Valley border area.  It broadcasts a talk radio format and is owned by Grupo Multimedios, through licensee Leading Media Group Corp.  The studios and offices are on North Jackson Road in McAllen.

By day, KURV is powered at 1,000 watts.  But at night it slightly reduces power to 910 watts.  It uses a directional antenna at all times, with a three-tower array at night.  The transmitter is off Rogers Road at Business U.S. Route 281 in Edinburg.

Programming
Weekdays begin with a local news and information show, "The Valley’s Morning News With Sergio Sanchez and Tim Sullivan."  Sanchez continues for another two hours with a talk show.  Afternoons feature "The Drive Home with Roxanne Flores, Zack Cantu, and Davis Rankin."  The rest of the weekday schedule is made up of nationally syndicated conservative talk shows, including Dana Loesch, Ben Shapiro, Chad Benson, "Ground Zero with Clyde Lewis," "Coast to Coast AM with George Noory", "First Light with Michael Toscano" and "This Morning, America's First News with Gordon Deal."

Weekends feature shows on money, health, religion, travel, movies, technology, hunting, fishing and the outdoors.  Weekend syndicated hosts include Kim Komando, Dave Ramsey, Rudy Maxa and "Somewhere in Time with Art Bell," as well as repeats of weekday shows.  Most hours begin with world and national news from Fox News Radio.

History
On October 19, 1947, KURV first signed on with 250 watts of power.  It was a daytime only station, required to go off the air at sunset to avoid interfering with other stations.  KURV was owned by J.C. Looney.

A sister station, KURV-FM, began broadcasting December 25, 1947.  It used 104.9 MHz with 1,000 watts effective radiated power.  Few people owned FM radios in that era and management eventually turned in the license and took KURV-FM dark.  Today, the frequency is home to KJAV-FM.

On March 17, 1997 the Federal Communications Commission (FCC) announced that eighty-eight stations had been given permission to move to newly available "Expanded Band" transmitting frequencies, ranging from 1610 to 1700 kHz, with KURV authorized to move from 710 to 1640 kHz. However, the station never procured the Construction Permit needed to implement the authorization, so the expanded band station was never built.

In 2004, Border Media Partners bought KURV and KSOX 1240 AM Raymondville for $7.5 million.  MBM Texas Valley LLC later acquired KURV, co-owned with KBUC Raymondville and KESO South Padre Island.

Effective February 10, 2021, MBM sold KURV and three sister stations to Grupo Multimedios for $6 million.

References

External links
R Communications Rio Grande Valley Radio
FCC History Cards for KURV

URV
Edinburg, Texas
Multimedios Radio